is a traditional Japanese card game that is similar to Baccarat.  It is typically played with special kabufuda cards.  A hanafuda deck can also be used, if the last two months are discarded, and Western playing cards can be used if the face cards are removed from the deck and aces are counted as one. Oicho-Kabu means 8-9 and uses the Japanese kabufuda names for the numbers one to ten. As in baccarat, this game also has a dealer, whom the players try to beat.

The goal of the game is to reach 9.  As in baccarat, the last digit of any total over 10 makes your hand: a 15 counts as 5, a 12 as 2, and a 20 as 0. 

The worst hand in oicho-kabu is an eight, a nine and a three, phonetically expressed as "ya-ku-za". This is the origin of the Japanese word for "gangster," yakuza.

References

Hanafuda card games
Gambling games
Japanese card games